Darin Raffaelli is a guitarist, formerly of the band Supercharger. In the 1990s he owned the indie record label Super-Teem. He was a producer for The Donnas and songwriter for the band's first album, which was recorded at a Mail Boxes Etc. shop where he worked, and released on his Super-Teem label in 1997. Other bands Raffaelli has been involved with to date are The Brentwoods, Donny Denim, The Bobbyteens, and The Fevers. He is now a member of the bands Mersey Wifebeaters and the Baci Galoopis.

References

Living people
American rock guitarists
American male guitarists
American record producers
American rock songwriters
Year of birth missing (living people)